Joan García Pons (born 4 May 2001) is a Spanish professional footballer who plays as a goalkeeper for RCD Espanyol.

Club career
Born in Sallent, Barcelona, Catalonia, García joined RCD Espanyol's youth setup in 2016, after representing CF Damm and CE Manresa. He made his senior debut with the reserves on 28 September 2019, starting in a 1–1 Segunda División B away draw against Valencia CF Mestalla.

On 11 February 2020, García renewed with the Pericos until 2025. He made his first-team debut on 1 December 2021, starting in a 3–2 away win over SD Solares-Medio Cudeyo in the season's Copa del Rey.

García made his professional – and La Liga – debut on 10 January 2022, starting in a 1–2 home loss against Elche CF.

References

External links
 Profile at the RCD Espanyol website
 
 

2001 births
Living people
People from Bages
Sportspeople from the Province of Barcelona
Spanish footballers
Footballers from Catalonia
Association football goalkeepers
La Liga players
Segunda División B players
RCD Espanyol B footballers
RCD Espanyol footballers
Spain youth international footballers
Spain under-21 international footballers
CF Damm players